The men's 10000 metres race of the 2013–14 ISU Speed Skating World Cup 3, arranged in the Alau Ice Palace, in Astana, Kazakhstan, was held on 1 December 2013.

Sven Kramer of the Netherlands won the race, extending his winning streak from the start of the season, while Alexis Contin of France came second, and Patrick Beckert of Germany came third. Douwe de Vries of the Netherlands won the Division B race.

Results
The race took place on Sunday, 1 December, with Division B scheduled in the morning session, at 10:49, and Division A scheduled in the afternoon session, from 16:10.

Division A

Division B

References

Men 10000
3